Mi St Univ can be an abbreviation for:
Michigan State University
Minnesota State University, Mankato
Minnesota State University, Moorhead